János Zsombolyai (30 January 1939 – 4 January 2015) was a Hungarian cinematographer, film director and screenwriter. His 1989 film Sentenced to Death was entered into the 40th Berlin International Film Festival. His films A Kenguru ("The Kangaroo") (1975) and Vámmentes házasság ("Duty-Free Marriage") (1980) enjoy cult film status in Hungary.

Selected filmography
 Forbidden Ground (1968)
 Horizon (1971)
 A Nice Neighbor (1979)
 Return (1985)
 Sentenced to Death (1989)
 Hungarian Rhapsody: Queen Live in Budapest ’86 (2012)

References

External links

1939 births
2015 deaths
Hungarian cinematographers
Hungarian film directors
Hungarian screenwriters
Male screenwriters
Hungarian male writers
Writers from Budapest